Castello Cantelmo-Caldora (Italian for Cantelmo-Caldora Castle)  is a  Middle Ages castle in Pacentro, Province of L'Aquila (Abruzzo).

History 
The castle was built before the 14th-15th century, because at this time was made its first restructuring. The most common assumption is that it dates back to the 11th-13th century, that is the age of the truncated tower placed at the north-east of the castle.

A main upgrades was completed in the second half of the 15th century, when the Orsini family built circular towers. Also the construction of the wall with a trapezoidal base is dated back to this period.

Architecture 
The base of the castle is with a trapezoidal shape. In the corners there are towers with a squared base: as of today, only three of them are still in place. There are also three circular bastions. The 17th century facade of the castle gives on a square where is placed also the church of Saint Mary Major.

References

External links

Caldora
Pacentro